Gymnolaemata are a class of Bryozoans. Gymnolaemata are sessile, mostly marine organisms and grow on the surfaces of rocks, kelp, and in some cases on animals, like fish. Zooids are cylindrical or flattened. The lophophore is protruded by action of muscles pulling on the frontal wall. This order includes the majority of living bryozoan species.

Orders 
 Cheilostomata Busk, 1852
 Ctenostomatida Busk, 1852

External links

References

 
Protostome classes